Virani may refer to:
 Asikni (goddess), a wife of Daksha.
Virani, Iran, a village in Razavi Khorasan Province, Iran
Virani, Hamadan, a village in Hamadan Province, Iran
Virani Moti, a village in Gujarat, India
Virani (surname)
Virani (poet) (16th century), Turkish poet, one of Seven Great Poets